Joseph Andrzej Dabrowski  (born July 17, 1964) is a Polish-Canadian prelate of the Catholic Church who has served as an auxiliary bishop of the Diocese of London, Ontario since 2015. Prior to being ordained a bishop, he was the North American superior of the Congregation of Saint Michael the Archangel beginning in 2013.

Biography

Early life 
Dabrowski was born in Wysoka Strzyżowska, Poland, and completed secondary school at the minor seminary of the Congregation of Saint Michael the Archangel. Inspired by his uncle, a Catholic priest, Dabrowski began seminary studies at the San Pietro Theological Institute in Viterbo, and was awarded a masters degree in philosophy and theology by the Pontificial Athenaeum of St. Anselm, and was ordained to the priesthood on May 4, 1991 by Divo Zadi, bishop of Civita Castellana.

Priesthood 
Joseph Dabrowski served as associate pastor at Our Lady of Częstochowa church until 1993, when he became chaplain of Cardinal Carter High School. He was made Pastor of St. Mary's Church, London, in 1991, a role he retained for eighteen years.

He served as adjunct spiritual director to St. Peter's Seminary from 2002 to 2003, and became North American superior of the Warsaw-based Congregation of Saint Michael the Archangel on June 19, 2013. Dabrowski is fluent in Polish, English, and Italian, and has studied Russian, Latin, and Spanish.

Episcopacy 
On January 31, 2015, Dabrowski was appointed auxiliary bishop of the Diocese of London, Ontario by Pope Francis. He was consecrated a bishop on April 14, 2015, by Bishop Ronald Fabbro.

He chose "Jesu in Te Confido" — meaning "Jesus, I Trust in You" — as his episcopal motto, in reference to Divine Mercy and the visions of Jesus Christ reported by Faustina Kowalska.

References 

1964 births
Living people
Polish Roman Catholic bishops
21st-century Roman Catholic bishops in Canada